Gema Zamprogna (born 24 May 1976) is a Canadian actress. She is best known for her role as Felicity King on Road to Avonlea and Mackie "Mac" Daniels in The Challengers.

Personal life 
Gema Zamprogna was born 24 May 1976 in Hamilton, Ontario. Her parents are professional dancers Lou and Pauline Zamprogna (1946-2013). She has two younger siblings; twins Dominic and Amanda.

She attended Hillfield Strathallan College where she had an arts scholarship.

She later attended Queen's University, where she graduated in 2000 with a Bachelor of Arts degree in Drama and is one of the founding members of Toronto's Theatrefront drama group.

She married Daniel Boich on 25 October 2003, and together they have three children; Daniella (b. November 2004), Sam (b. 8 May 2006) and Luka. 

Zamprogna established Studio Technique Pilates in Burlington, Ontario in 2003. In 2011, she moved her family to Grimsby and opened Grimsby Pilates, in addition to teaching and choreographing musical productions at The Dance Centre and the Theatre Aquarius Performing Arts Programme.

In 2017, Zamprogna and her sister opened Zamprogna Arts in Hamilton, Ontario.

Filmography

Awards and nominations

References

External links 

 
 Gema Zamprogna on Northern Stars
 Gema Zamprogna on Zamprogna Arts

Canadian film actresses
1976 births
Living people
Canadian television actresses
Queen's University at Kingston alumni
Actresses from Hamilton, Ontario
Canadian people of Italian descent